is a 1956 color Japanese film directed by Toshio Sugie. It is romance comedy film.

Production designer was Shinobu Muraki, sound recordist was Shoichi Fujinawa and lighting technician was Mitsuo Kaneko.

Cast

References

External links
 

1956 films
Films directed by Toshio Sugie
Toho films
1950s Japanese films
Japanese romantic comedy films
1956 romantic comedy films